Conor Anthony McGregor (born 14 July 1988) is an Irish professional mixed martial artist. He is a former Ultimate Fighting Championship (UFC) featherweight and lightweight double-champion. He is the first UFC fighter to hold UFC championships in two weight classes simultaneously. He is also the former Cage Warriors featherweight and lightweight champion.

In his debut professional boxing match, he was defeated by Floyd Mayweather Jr. He is the biggest pay-per-view (PPV) draw in MMA history, having headlined the five highest-selling UFC pay-per-view events. His bout with Khabib Nurmagomedov at UFC 229 drew 2.4 million PPV buys, the most ever for an MMA event. His boxing match with Mayweather drew 4.3 million PPV buys in North America, the second most in combat sports history. McGregor was ranked as the world's highest-paid athlete by Forbes in 2021, earning a reported $180 million. He also featured in the list in 2018, when he was ranked fourth, with a reported income of $99 million.

Early life
Conor Anthony McGregor was born in Crumlin, Dublin. He was raised in Crumlin, and attended Irish-language schools — the Gaelscoil Scoil Mológa, in Harold's Cross, at primary level, and Gaelcholáiste Coláiste de hÍde in Tallaght at secondary level, where he also developed his passion for sport, playing football.

In his youth, he played football for Lourdes Celtic Football Club. At the age of 12, he also began boxing at Crumlin Boxing Club, as a way to defend himself against bullies and raise his confidence.

In 2006, McGregor moved with his family to Lucan, Dublin, attending Gaelcholáiste Coláiste Cois Life. Following that, he commenced a plumbing apprenticeship. While in Lucan, he met future UFC fighter Tom Egan and they soon started training mixed martial arts (MMA) together.

Amateur mixed martial arts career
On 17 February 2007, at the age of 18, McGregor made his mixed martial arts debut in an amateur fight against Kieran Campbell for the Irish Ring of Truth promotion in Dublin. He won via technical knockout (TKO) in the first round. Following the fight, he turned professional and was signed by the Irish Cage of Truth promotion. In 2008, McGregor began training at the Straight Blast Gym (SBG) in Dublin under John Kavanagh.

Professional mixed martial arts career

Early career (2008–2013)
On 9 March 2008, McGregor had his first professional MMA bout, as a lightweight, defeating Gary Morris with a second-round TKO. After McGregor won his second fight against Mo Taylor, he made his featherweight debut in a loss via kneebar against submission specialist Artemij Sitenkov. After a victory at featherweight in his next bout against Stephen Bailey, McGregor contemplated a different career path before his mother contacted his coach John Kavanagh and reinvigorated him to continue pursuing mixed martial arts.

McGregor then won his next fight, also at featherweight, against Connor Dillon, before moving back to lightweight for a fight against Joseph Duffy, in which he received his second professional loss after submitting to an arm-triangle choke. Following this, during 2011 and 2012, McGregor went on an eight-fight winning streak, during which he won both the CWFC Featherweight and Lightweight championships, making him the first European professional mixed martial artist to hold titles in two divisions simultaneously.

In February 2013, UFC president Dana White made a trip to Dublin, Ireland to receive a Gold Medal of Honorary Patronage from Trinity College and was inundated with requests to sign McGregor to the UFC. After a meeting with McGregor, and talking with UFC CEO Lorenzo Fertitta, White offered him a contract days later.

Ultimate Fighting Championship (2013–present)

2013
In February 2013, the Ultimate Fighting Championship (UFC) announced that they had signed McGregor to a multi-fight contract. In joining, he became only the second fighter from Ireland to compete for the company, following team member Tom Egan.

On 6 April 2013, McGregor made his UFC debut against Marcus Brimage at UFC on Fuel TV: Mousasi vs. Latifi. He won the fight by knockout in round one. The win also earned McGregor his first "Knockout of the Night" award.

McGregor was expected to face Andy Ogle on 17 August 2013 at UFC Fight Night 26, but Ogle pulled out of the bout citing an injury and was replaced by eventual UFC Featherweight Champion Max Holloway. McGregor won the fight by unanimous decision (30–27, 30–27, and 30–26). Following the bout with Holloway, an MRI scan revealed that McGregor had torn his anterior cruciate ligament (ACL) during the bout and would require surgery, keeping him out of action for up to ten months.

2014
McGregor was expected to face Cole Miller on 19 July 2014 at UFC Fight Night 46 in his comeback bout after recovering from his ACL injury. However, Miller pulled out of the bout citing a thumb injury and was replaced by Diego Brandão. McGregor fought Brandão in front of a loud, rowdy crowd of 9,500 at The O2 in his hometown of Dublin, Ireland. The fight was officially halted by referee Leon Roberts at 4:05 of the first round. The win earned McGregor his first "Performance of the Night" award.

Prior to his next bout, McGregor met with Lorenzo Fertitta and signed a new multi-fight contract with the UFC. McGregor next faced Dustin Poirier on 27 September 2014 at UFC 178. Despite McGregor landing 9 significant strikes to Poirier's 10, he managed to secure a victory early on in the first round, by pressuring Poirier onto his back foot, before exploding with a left hook behind Poirier's ear, forcing referee Herb Dean to step in. The finish officially came at 1:46 into the first round. This marked Poirier's first UFC loss via KO/TKO, and earned McGregor his second straight "Performance of the Night" award.

2015

Championship pursuits
McGregor faced Dennis Siver on 18 January 2015 at UFC Fight Night 59. He won the fight via TKO in the second round. The victory also earned McGregor his third straight "Performance of the Night" award.

Interim Featherweight Championship bout
The highly anticipated bout with Aldo was announced on 30 January 2015, at the UFC 183 Q&A. McGregor declared that he was expected to face Aldo on 11 July 2015 at UFC 189 for the undisputed UFC Featherweight Championship, during the UFC's annual International Fight Week. The fight took place at the MGM Grand Garden Arena in Las Vegas, Nevada. The UFC, confident that the fight would exceed expectations, increased the promotional budget for the event, with company Dana White stating that "[the UFC] spent more money promoting Aldo–McGregor than any fight in UFC history."

The fight against Aldo was announced on 30 January 2015, at the UFC 183 and both McGregor and Aldo embarked on a 12-day world tour, during which eight cities in five countries were visited, including Aldo's home country of Brazil (Rio de Janeiro) and McGregor's hometown of Dublin. The tour began in Rio de Janeiro on 20 March, and completed in Dublin on 31 March. However, on 23 June, it was reported that Aldo had suffered a rib fracture and had pulled out of the bout as a consequence. McGregor remained on the card and was rescheduled to face Chad Mendes for the Interim Featherweight Championship. The official attendance for the event, 16,019, broke the record in Nevada, while the gate of $7,200,000 broke the record for a mixed martial arts event in the United States. Prior to the fight, McGregor's entrance song, "The Foggy Dew", was sung live by Irish singer-songwriter Sinéad O'Connor. McGregor won the fight via TKO, winning the UFC Interim Featherweight Championship.

McGregor then took part in UFC's The Ultimate Fighter, in which he coached against Urijah Faber. Faber's team member Ryan Hall ended up winning the competition.

Featherweight Championship unification bout
On 10 August, it was announced that the event would take place on 12 December, and McGregor would face José Aldo for the UFC Featherweight Championship. At the weigh-ins, both McGregor and Aldo achieved the weight limit of 145 pounds. McGregor knocked out Aldo thirteen seconds into the first round with a left hook, snapping his seven-year-long WEC and UFC title reign and eighteen-fight win streak to claim the title, earning the "Performance of the Night" bonus as well. This finish marked the fastest knockout in a title bout in UFC history.

2016

First UFC loss

McGregor faced The Ultimate Fighter Season 5 winner, and former UFC Lightweight Championship challenger Nate Diaz on 5 March 2016 at UFC 196 in a welterweight bout.  On 24 February 2016, a press conference was held to help promote the new main event, with both men trading insults. At the Thursday pre-fight press conference on 3 March, McGregor and Diaz engaged in a brief scuffle during a face-off, after McGregor landed a strike on Diaz's lead hand.

The fight began with combination in the first round, Diaz returned fire with two consecutive hooks, one a slap, a signature of Nate and his brother, Nick Diaz, termed the "Stockton Slap". McGregor had success with his bodywork, but Diaz began to land combinations of his own. After a one-two punches from Diaz, McGregor attempted a double leg takedown, which Diaz defended by sprawling. Diaz then threatened the guillotine choke, which forced McGregor onto his back after stopping McGregor from scrambling and Diaz secured the mount and secured a rear naked choke. McGregor tapped to the submission at 4:12 into the second round. Both competitors were awarded "Fight of the Night" bonuses, and McGregor received the highest disclosed purse of any fighter in the history of the company to that point, at $1,000,000. McGregor was critical of his own performance while praising Diaz, saying "I was inefficient with my energy. It was a battle of energy and he got the better of that."

Rematch with Nate Diaz
A rematch with Diaz was scheduled for 9 July at UFC 200; however, on 19 April, the UFC announced that McGregor had been pulled from the event after failing to fulfil media obligations related to the fight. In turn, the fight with McGregor was rescheduled and took place the following month, contested again at welterweight, at UFC 202. McGregor won the rematch via majority decision (48–47, 47–47, and 48–47). The bout was once again awarded "Fight of the Night" honours. The event broke the record previously held by UFC 100 for the highest selling pay-per-view in UFC history, with 1,650,000 buys.

Two-division champion
On 27 September, it was officially announced that McGregor's next bout would be against Eddie Alvarez for the UFC Lightweight Championship on 12 November at UFC 205. After dropping Alvarez multiple times throughout the first round, McGregor landed a multiple-punch combination to stop his opponent via technical knockout in the second round. This result marked the first time a competitor had held UFC championships in two different weight classes, and also repeated McGregor's feat during his career at Cage Warriors. This win earned him the "Performance of the Night", and it is widely considered one of McGregor's best performances inside the octagon.

Stripping of Featherweight Championship
On 26 November, due to his inactivity in the division, it was initially announced that McGregor had vacated the Featherweight Championship, therefore promoting José Aldo to undisputed champion. McGregor's coach, however, confirmed further reports which stated that McGregor had actually been stripped of the title.

2017
After winning the lightweight championship at UFC 205, McGregor announced he would take time off from the UFC to wait for the birth of his first child due in 2017. McGregor spent the majority of his public appearances in early-2017 campaigning for a boxing match with Floyd Mayweather Jr. After months of negotiations, the two finally came to terms on 14 June 2017 and announced the match to take place on 26 August. The match ultimately ended in the 10th round with a victory by TKO for Mayweather.

2018
After the conclusion of UFC 223 on 7 April, McGregor was stripped of the UFC Lightweight Championship due to inactivity and Khabib Nurmagomedov was crowned the undisputed champion after defeating Al Iaquinta at the event.

On 3 August, it was announced that McGregor would return to the octagon for the first time since November 2016 at UFC 229 to challenge the undefeated Khabib Nurmagomedov for the UFC Lightweight Championship on 6 October. This bout was considered one of the biggest contests in the history of the sport and it was filled with pre-fight hype. Nurmagomedov submitted McGregor with a neck crank in the fourth round.

2019
On 26 March 2019, McGregor announced his retirement on social media. However, Dana White viewed this announcement as a ploy to secure an ownership stake in the company, with White later suggesting his retirement would not last and that he had been in regular contact with him and stated he would fight again in the future. McGregor had previously tweeted that he wanted a rematch with Khabib Nurmagomedov and that he would see him in the Octagon.

2020
After over a year away from the Octagon, McGregor faced Donald Cerrone in a welterweight bout on 18 January 2020 at UFC 246. He won the fight via technical knockout 40 seconds into the first round. This win earned him a Performance of the Night award. The win made McGregor the first UFC fighter to hold knockout finishes in the featherweight, lightweight, and welterweight divisions. On 6 June 2020, McGregor announced once more that he was retiring from fighting.

2021
Despite talks of retirement, McGregor was booked to face former UFC Lightweight Championship challenger Dustin Poirier in a rematch of their 2014 bout at UFC 257 on 24 January 2021. He lost the fight via technical knockout in the second round, marking the first knockout loss in his career.  McGregor was later handed a 6–month medical suspension after the knockout.

McGregor faced Dustin Poirier for a third time on 10 July 2021 at UFC 264. McGregor lost the fight via technical knockout in round one after the ringside doctor stopped the bout. McGregor had a broken tibia, which rendered him unable to continue.

2023 
After the layoff nursing his leg injury, it was announced that McGregor would be coaching The Ultimate Fighter 31 for the second time, this time against Michael Chandler. They will face each other after the season, at an event yet to be determined.

Mixed martial arts fighting style
McGregor is known mostly as a striker and prefers to fight standing up, as opposed to on the ground. McGregor is left-handed and primarily fights out of the southpaw stance, but often switches to an orthodox stance. He will frequently try to be the aggressor in his bouts. McGregor's boxing is typically considered his best skill, with the majority of his victories coming by way of knockout or technical knockout via punches. Many pundits cite McGregor's pull-back left-handed counter as his most dangerous strike.

McGregor's signature style off arena is to repeatedly engage in trash talk and "psychological warfare" against his opponents, which has led to earning him the moniker 'The Notorious' and has brought comparisons with Muhammad Ali, whom McGregor cites as one of his early inspirations. After Ali died in June 2016, McGregor opined that "nobody will ever come close to [Ali's] greatness". McGregor has also cited Bruce Lee as an inspiration, and compared himself to Lee. During the buildup to his bout against Donald Cerrone and the rematch against Dustin Poirier, McGregor was respectful towards his opponents and refrained from trash talking. However, McGregor heavily used trash talk in the build up to his trilogy fight with Poirier.

Professional boxing career

Fight against Floyd Mayweather Jr.

On 14 June 2017, it was announced that McGregor would compete in his first professional boxing match against the undefeated Floyd Mayweather Jr., on 26 August 2017 at T-Mobile Arena in Paradise, Nevada. The fight was broadcast on Showtime PPV in the US and Sky Sports Box Office in the UK. The bout was contested at super welterweight (154 pounds) with 8 oz. gloves. The fight was expected to be the richest in boxing history.

On 24 August 2017, it was announced that Mayweather and McGregor would compete for the WBC Money Belt. According to the Nevada State Athletic Commission, Mayweather would earn a guaranteed purse of $100 million and McGregor was guaranteed $30 million. The match resulted in Mayweather winning via TKO in the 10th round, with the scorecards reading 87–83, 89–82, and 89–81, all in favour of Mayweather. The Nevada State Athletic Commission announced the live gate for the event was $55,414,865.79 from 13,094 tickets sold. Given the success in pay-per-views, Mayweather reportedly earned around $280 million overall, while McGregor came out with earning $130 million.

Personal life
McGregor has two sisters named Erin and Aoife. He has been in a relationship with his fiancée, Dee Devlin, since 2008. They have three children.

McGregor often trains at the Mjölnir gym in Reykjavík, alongside fellow UFC fighter Gunnar Nelson. He has stated that he does not adhere to any pre-fight rituals or superstitions because he believes them to be "a form of fear".

McGregor is a Catholic.

McGregor is a football fan and a supporter of both Celtic and Manchester United. He has also expressed support for Paris Saint-Germain, being a friend of Sergio Ramos.

Business ventures and endorsements
McGregor has endorsement deals with Beats by Dre, Monster Energy, Reebok and Bud Light. As of 2017, his endorsement deals rounded up to $7 million. In early 2018, McGregor signed a deal with Burger King.

August McGregor
Just ahead of his fight with Mayweather, McGregor announced a fashion partnership with tailoring brand David August; the brand is named "August McGregor" and is aimed at providing modern men's suits to millennials. August had met McGregor about three years earlier, via Dana White.

Proper No. Twelve Irish Whiskey
In September 2018, McGregor launched Proper No. Twelve Irish whiskey in Ireland and the United States. The whiskey is named after the Crumlin neighbourhood in Dublin 12, in which McGregor grew up.

In late 2018, McGregor said that the brand had sold "hundreds of thousands" of bottles since the launch, and plans were to restock in the United States and Ireland in December 2018. McGregor confirmed the brand will extend distribution to the UK, Australia, New Zealand, Russia, and Canada in 2019. In 2021, it was reported that McGregor and his business partners sold their majority stake in the company to Proximo Spirits, who previously had a 49% stake, for a deal worth a reported $600 million.

In an August 2022 interview Artem Lobov alleged that McGregor was initially headed towards creating a vodka product, but it was Lobov who pitched the idea of doing a whiskey instead. In the same interview, Lobov also stated that he was the one who did the background study and conducted business deals for the product. In late November 2022, news surfaced that Lobov had sued McGregor, seeking 5 percent of the proceeds of the $600 million deal conducted in 2021. Following the suing, McGregor aimed several social media messages at Lobov, who subsequently filed another lawsuit against McGregor for defamation, intimidation and harassment. In January 2023, the latter lawsuit was denied by the judge and Lobov was ordered to pay the legal fees.

McGregor’s pub targeted with petrol bombs 
McGregor's pub, The Black Forge Inn, in Ireland was targeted by criminals with a petrol bomb on January 12, 2022, but no one was injured and no property was damaged. No arrests have been made and the incident is being investigated by Irish authorities. McGregor offered a cash reward for information leading to the discovery of the identities of those involved.

Acting
In 2022, Conor McGregor was cast along with the actor Jake Gyllenhaal in a remake of the 1989 movie Road House.

Controversies

Driving offences
In November 2017 McGregor pleaded guilty to exceeding the speed limit in Rathcoole, County Dublin. He was fined €400. In November 2018 he pleaded guilty to speeding in Kill, County Kildare, and was fined €1,000 and disqualified from driving for six months.

On March 22, 2022, McGregor was arrested in Dublin and charged with six driving offences, including two counts of dangerous driving, being uninsured, having no licence, and failing to produce his documents. His car was seized by the Irish police. He was released on bail and his car was returned to him. He was scheduled to appear before Blanchardstown district court in April 2022, and, if convicted, could be subject to a fine of up to €5,000, six months' imprisonment, or both.

On June 23, 2022, McGregor appeared in Blanchardstown District Court in relation to events on March 22, 2022. He was remanded on continuing bail pending "further charges" as part of a dangerous driving prosecution. He has not yet indicated a plea and the judge remanded him to appear on 8 September 2022 for directions from the Director of Public Prosecutions.

Incident at Bellator 187
On 10 November 2017, McGregor's SBG Ireland teammate Charlie Ward made his debut at Bellator 187 in Dublin against John Redmond. Ward knocked out Redmond in round one, and McGregor jumped the cage (he was not a licensed cornerman) to celebrate Ward's win while the fight was not yet officially declared over. McGregor was separated by referee Marc Goddard, as Goddard needed to verify if the knockout was before the bell, and to ensure lock down of the cage for medical staff to assess the health of the knocked out Redmond. McGregor charged towards Goddard: while he pushed and confronted Goddard in a wild melee, he also checked on the downed Redmond and knocked him down while he was trying to get up.

McGregor did a lap around the cage after he exited the cage a few minutes later, then climbed and straddled the cage apron to continue the celebration of Ward's win. He was stopped by a commissioner and McGregor, agitated, slapped the commissioner's face. Redmond stated after the fight that Goddard intended to let the fight continue to round two, but the Mohegan Sun commission, which oversaw the event, elected to end the fight due to McGregor's behaviour in the ring.

A day after the incident, the head of the commission for Bellator 187, Mike Mazzulli, the president of both the Mohegan Tribe Department of Athletic Regulation (MTDAR) and Association of Boxing Commissions, issued a statement, stating that "McGregor's conduct jeopardized the health and safety" of fighters who were in the cage during the Ireland event. In addition, Mr McGregor assaulted Referee Mark Goddard and a (member of) Bellator staff."

Bus attack at UFC 223 Media Day
On 3 April 2018, Khabib Nurmagomedov and Artem Lobov had a minor altercation, in which Nurmagomedov cornered Lobov at a hotel in Brooklyn, New York. Lobov is known to be close to McGregor, with whom Nurmagomedov has had altercations and trash talk exchanges. The two groups have a lengthy history of insults and confrontations.

On 5 April 2018, during promotional appearances for UFC 223, McGregor and a group of about twenty others were let into the Barclays Center by credentialed members of his promotional team. They attempted to confront Nurmagomedov, who was on a bus leaving the arena with "red corner" fighters for UFC 223 on it, such as Rose Namajunas, Al Iaquinta, Karolina Kowalkiewicz, Ray Borg, and Michael Chiesa. McGregor ran up alongside the slowly moving bus and then ran past it to grab a metal equipment dolly, which he then threw at the bus's window, before trying to throw other objects in the vicinity. Chiesa and Borg were injured by the shattered glass and sent to hospital. They were soon removed from the card on the advice of the NYSAC and the UFC's medical team. Lobov was also pulled from his fight for his involvement in the dispute.

Dana White said there was a warrant out for McGregor's arrest, and the NYPD said McGregor was a person of interest. White said McGregor had told him via text message: "This had to be done." "You can imagine he's going to be sued beyond belief", White said, and denied suggestions that the violence was a publicity stunt intended to generate interest in the UFC. McGregor and others involved initially fled the Barclays Center after the incident, although he and a fellow accused turned themselves in that night. McGregor was charged with three counts of assault and one count of criminal mischief. He was further charged with menacing and reckless endangerment at his arraignment and released on $50,000 bail until 14 June 2018. Under the bail conditions negotiated by his then attorney, Jim Walden, and set by the judge, McGregor was allowed to travel without restriction. On 12 April 2018, McGregor hired lawyer Bruce Mafeo of Cozen O'Connor to represent him in this matter. McGregor pleaded no contest to a count of disorderly conduct and was ordered to perform five days of community service and attend anger management classes. On 12 September 2018, Chiesa announced a lawsuit against McGregor, saying that he "experienced pain, suffering and a loss of enjoyment of life" as a result of the attack.

Incident at UFC 229

Following the fight at UFC 229 on 6 October 2018, Khabib Nurmagomedov jumped out of the cage and charged towards McGregor's training partner Dillon Danis. Soon afterwards, McGregor and Abubakar Nurmagomedov, Khabib's cousin, also attempted to exit the octagon, but a scuffle broke out after McGregor punched Abubakar, who then punched him back. Two of Nurmagomedov's cornermen retaliated: Esed Emiragaev and Zubaira Tukhugov, who was scheduled to fight on 27 October 2018 at UFC Fight Night: Volkan vs. Smith against Artem Lobov, the McGregor team member who was confronted by Nurmagomedov in April 2018. Nurmagomedov's payment for the fight was withheld by the Nevada State Athletic Commission (NSAC) as a result, pending an investigation into his actions. Nurmagomedov appeared at the post-fight interview and apologized to the NSAC.

The NSAC filed a formal complaint against both McGregor and Nurmagomedov and on 24 October, the NSAC voted to approve a motion to release half of Nurmagomedov's $2 million fight payout immediately. Both Nurmagomedov and McGregor received indefinite bans, at least until the official hearing, which took place in December 2018. On 29 January 2019, the NSAC announced a six-month suspension for McGregor, (retroactive to 6 October 2018) and a $50,000 fine. He became eligible to compete again on 6 April 2019.

Dublin sexual assault allegations
In March 2019, The New York Times reported that McGregor was under investigation by the Irish police, following allegations of a sexual assault on a woman in a Dublin hotel in December 2018. A second allegation of sexual assault was reported on in October 2019, regarding an assault on a woman in a car alleged to have taken place earlier that month.

In January 2021, after prosecutors declined to prosecute McGregor for the 2018 alleged sexual assault, a civil claim for damages was launched in the High Court. A spokeswoman for McGregor said in a statement that the allegations against McGregor were "categorically rejected" and that McGregor is "confident that justice will prevail" in the civil case. In March 2022 the High Court made a pre-trial discovery order against McGregor in the case. The order requires the Irish police agency Gardaí to disclose certain information and documents gathered by them. The Gardaí must disclose any statements made by McGregor or the other man or witnesses during their enquiries. It also requests any CCTV stills or footage from locations in Dublin, including outside the Goat Bar and Grill, the Gerard Paul Salon in Goatstown, an interior camera in a taxi and the Beacon Hotel and surroundings in Sandyford. All information obtained from mobile phones between 31 October and 7 December 2018 and must also be supplied. Any results of medical, forensic or toxicology reports are also requested. Discovery is to take ten weeks.

Florida robbery arrest

On 11 March 2019, McGregor was arrested outside of the Fontainebleau Hotel in Miami Beach, Florida after he attacked a fan taking a picture with a cellphone. In an incident that was caught on CCTV, McGregor lunged to hit the man, grabbed his device and smashed it on the ground with his feet. Subsequently he was arrested and charged with strong-armed robbery and criminal mischief. McGregor was held in custody for several hours before being released on a $5,000 bond. On 14 March 2019, news surfaced that McGregor was also facing a civil lawsuit from the fan involved in the incident. On 8 April, the civil lawsuit against McGregor was dropped by the fan. On 13 May, it was revealed that the criminal charges against McGregor had also been dropped after the accuser's attorney said that his client had "been made whole" by McGregor, in a reference to an out-of-court settlement that was reached.

Dublin pub assault
On 15 August 2019, TMZ Sports published a video that showed McGregor punching an older man at The Marble Arch Pub in Dublin. The incident happened on 6 April and was originally reported by Irish media, although without the video that showed the attack. McGregor had repeatedly offered the victim a shot of his whiskey, which the victim repeatedly declined, then McGregor had punched him. Irish police stated that they had opened an investigation. McGregor was charged with assault and first appeared in court on 11 October 2019. The court heard that McGregor had 18 prior convictions from 2018 going back to 2009. The majority were for driving offences, but he was given the Probation Act in 2009 when he was an apprentice plumber for an assault causing harm offence.  On 1 November, McGregor pleaded guilty to the assault and was fined €1,000.

Corsica arrest
On 10 September 2020, McGregor was arrested in Corsica on suspicion of attempted sexual assault and indecent exposure for an incident alleged to have taken place in a bar. After being held in custody for two days while being interviewed by police, he was released without charge. Eight months later, French authorities dropped the investigation due to insufficient evidence.

Altercation with Machine Gun Kelly 
McGregor was involved in an altercation with recording artist Machine Gun Kelly (MGK) at the 2021 MTV Video Music Awards, held at the Barclays Center in Brooklyn, New York on 12 September 2021. After exchanging a few words, McGregor attempted to throw a punch at MGK, which did not land. Both were held back by guards and others who walked on the red carpet. No charges were filed and police were not involved, but the scuffle was widely reported in the media.

Alleged attack on Francesco Facchinetti 
On 17 October 2021, McGregor allegedly assaulted Francesco Facchinetti, an Italian musician and TV presenter, in a nightclub in Rome, breaking Facchinetti's nose in front of witnesses and bodyguards. A few days later, Facchinetti filed charges against McGregor for the attack.

Alleged attack on yacht 
In January 2023, McGregor was accused of assaulting a 42-year-old woman aboard his yacht in Ibiza, Spain during his birthday party on July 22, 2022. The woman claimed she was berated by McGregor before being physically assaulted. She further claimed that she was forced to jump from the yacht to escape McGregor and that she sustained a broken arm in the process. The woman did not file a formal statement with Spanish police at the time of the incident. In January she gave a formal statement with Irish police, who then shared that statement with their Spanish counterparts. The woman has also filed a civil suit against McGregor over the alleged incident. After making her formal statement the woman's car was set ablaze outside of her Dublin home. In February a brick was reportedly thrown through a window of that residence. In late February 2023, news surfaced that the lawsuit was discontinued by the plaintiff, with no further information provided.

Championships and accomplishments

Mixed martial arts
 Ultimate Fighting Championship
 Interim UFC Featherweight Championship (One time)
 UFC Featherweight Championship (One time)
 UFC Lightweight Championship (One time)
 Fight of the Night (Two times) 
 Knockout of the Night (One time) 
 Performance of the Night (Seven times) 
 First Irish-born UFC champion 
 Third Multi-Divisional Champion in UFC History (Featherweight, Lightweight)
 First simultaneous multi-divisional champion in UFC history (Featherweight, Lightweight)
 Most consecutive Performance of the Night awards in UFC history (5)
 Most consecutive post-fight bonuses in UFC history (8)
 Tied for second-most Performance of the Night awards in UFC history (7)
 Fastest title fight victory in UFC history (13 seconds) 
 Cage Warriors Fighting Championship
 CWFC Featherweight Championship (One time)
 CWFC Lightweight Championship (One time)
 Bleacher Report
 2015 Fighter of the Year
 2016 Fight of the Year vs. Nate Diaz at UFC 202
 ESPN
 2015 Fighter of the Year
 ESPYs
 2016 Best Fighter
 2016 Nominee for Best Breakthrough Athlete
 Fight Matrix
 Lineal Featherweight Championship (one time, current)
 Fox Sports
 2015 Fighter of the Year
 2016 Fight of the Year vs. Nate Diaz at UFC 202
 MMA Fighting
 2015 Event of the Year 
 2015 Fighter of the Year
 MMA Junkie
 2015 December Knockout of the Month vs. José Aldo
 2015 Fighter of the Year
2016 March Fight of the Month vs. Nate Diaz
2016 August Fight of the Month vs. Nate Diaz
 MMA Insider
 2013 Best UFC Newcomer
 MMA Mania
 2015 Event of the Year 
 2015 Fighter of the Year
 RTÉ Sport
 2016 RTÉ Sports Person of the Year
 Rolling Stone
 25 Hottest Sex Symbols of 2015 
 Severe MMA
 2014 Irish Pro Fighter of the Year
 2015 Irish Pro Fighter of the Year
 2015 Fighter of the Year
 Sherdog
 2014 Breakthrough Fighter of the Year
 2015 Event of the Year 
 2015 Knockout of the Year 
 2015 Fighter of the Year
 2016 Fighter of the Year
 The MMA Community
 2015 Male Fighter of the Year
 Time 
 2017 Top 100 Most Influential People 
 VIP Style Awards
 2015 Ireland's Most Stylish Man
 World MMA Awards
 2014 International Fighter of the Year
 2015 International Fighter of the Year
 2015 Fighter of the Year
 2016 Fighter of the Year
 Wrestling Observer Newsletter
 2016, 2017, 2018, 2020 and 2021 Best Box Office Draw
 2015, 2016 and 2017 Best on Interviews
 2015 Feud of the Year vs. José Aldo
 2016 Feud of the Year vs. Nate Diaz
 2016 and 2018 Mixed Martial Arts Most Valuable
 2016 Most Charismatic
 2015 and 2016 Most Outstanding Fighter of the Year

Pay-per-view bouts

MMA

Professional boxing

Filmography

Film

Mixed martial arts record

|-
|Loss 
|align=center|22–6
|Dustin Poirier
|TKO (doctor stoppage) 
|UFC 264
|
|align=center|1
|align=center|5:00
|Las Vegas, Nevada, United States
|
|-
|Loss
|align=center|22–5
|Dustin Poirier
|TKO (punches)
|UFC 257
|
|align=center|2
|align=center|2:32
|Abu Dhabi, United Arab Emirates
|
|-
|Win
|align=center|22–4
|Donald Cerrone
|TKO (head kick and punches) 
|UFC 246
|
|align=center|1
|align=center|0:40
|Las Vegas, Nevada, United States
|
|-
|Loss
|align=center|21–4
|
|Submission (neck crank) 
|UFC 229 
|
|align=center|4
|align=center|3:03
|Las Vegas, Nevada, United States
|
|-
|Win
|align=center|21–3
|Eddie Alvarez
|TKO (punches)
|UFC 205
|
|align=center|2
|align=center|3:04
|New York City, New York, United States
|
|-
|Win
|align=center|20–3
|Nate Diaz
|Decision (majority)
|UFC 202
|
|align=center|5
|align=center|5:00
|Las Vegas, Nevada, United States
|
|-
|Loss
|align=center|19–3
|Nate Diaz
| Submission (rear-naked choke)
|UFC 196
|
|align=center|2
|align=center|4:12
|Las Vegas, Nevada, United States
|
|-
| Win
| align=center| 19–2
| José Aldo
| KO (punch)
| UFC 194
| 
| align=center|1
| align=center|0:13
| Las Vegas, Nevada, United States
| 
|-
| Win
| style="text-align:center;" | 18–2
| Chad Mendes
| TKO (punches)
| UFC 189
| 
| style="text-align:center;" | 2
| style="text-align:center;" | 4:57
| Las Vegas, Nevada, United States
| 
|-
| Win
| style="text-align:center;" | 17–2
| Dennis Siver
| TKO (punches)
| UFC Fight Night: McGregor vs. Siver
| 
| style="text-align:center;" | 2
| style="text-align:center;" | 1:54
| Boston, Massachusetts, United States
| 
|-
| Win
| style="text-align:center;" | 16–2
| Dustin Poirier
| TKO (punches)
| UFC 178
| 
| style="text-align:center;" | 1
| style="text-align:center;" | 1:46
| Las Vegas, Nevada, United States
| 
|-
| Win
| style="text-align:center;" | 15–2
| Diego Brandão
| TKO (punches)
| UFC Fight Night: McGregor vs. Brandão
| 
| style="text-align:center;" | 1
| style="text-align:center;" | 4:05
| Dublin, Ireland
| 
|-
| Win
| style="text-align:center;" | 14–2
| Max Holloway
| Decision (unanimous)
| UFC Fight Night: Shogun vs. Sonnen
| 
| style="text-align:center;" | 3
| style="text-align:center;" | 5:00
| Boston, Massachusetts, United States
|
|-
| Win
| style="text-align:center;" | 13–2
| Marcus Brimage
| TKO (punches)
| UFC on Fuel TV: Mousasi vs. Latifi
| 
| style="text-align:center;" | 1
| style="text-align:center;" | 1:07
| Stockholm, Sweden
| 
|-
| Win
| style="text-align:center;" | 12–2
| Ivan Buchinger
| KO (punch)
| Cage Warriors: 51
| 
| style="text-align:center;" | 1
| style="text-align:center;" | 3:40
| Dublin, Ireland
| 
|-
| Win
| style="text-align:center;" | 11–2
| Dave Hill
| Submission (rear-naked choke)
| Cage Warriors: 47
| 
| style="text-align:center;" | 2
| style="text-align:center;" | 4:10
| Dublin, Ireland
| 
|-
| Win
| style="text-align:center;" | 10–2
| Steve O'Keefe
| KO (elbows)
| Cage Warriors: 45
| 
| style="text-align:center;" | 1
| style="text-align:center;" | 1:35
| London, England
| 
|-
| Win
| style="text-align:center;" | 9–2
| Aaron Jahnsen
| TKO (punches)
| Cage Warriors: Fight Night 2
| 
| style="text-align:center;" | 1
| style="text-align:center;" | 3:29
| Amman, Jordan
|
|-
| Win
| style="text-align:center;" | 8–2
| Artur Sowinski
| TKO (punches)
| Celtic Gladiator 2: Clash of the Giants
| 
| style="text-align:center;" | 2
| style="text-align:center;" | 1:12
| Portlaoise, Ireland
| 
|-
| Win
| style="text-align:center;" | 7–2
| Paddy Doherty
| KO (punch)
| Immortal Fighting Championship 4
| 
| style="text-align:center;" | 1
| style="text-align:center;" | 0:04
| Letterkenny, Ireland
|
|-
| Win
| style="text-align:center;" | 6–2
| Mike Wood
| KO (punches)
| Cage Contender 8
| 
| style="text-align:center;" | 1
| style="text-align:center;" | 0:16
| Dublin, Ireland
| 
|-
| Win
| style="text-align:center;" | 5–2
| Hugh Brady
| TKO (punches)
| Chaos FC 8
| 
| style="text-align:center;" | 1
| style="text-align:center;" | 2:31
| Derry, Northern Ireland
|
|-
| Loss
| style="text-align:center;" | 4–2
| Joseph Duffy
| Submission (arm-triangle choke)
| Cage Warriors 39: The Uprising
| 
| style="text-align:center;" | 1
| style="text-align:center;" | 0:38
| Cork, Ireland
|
|-
| Win
| style="text-align:center;" | 4–1
| Connor Dillon
| TKO (corner stoppage)
| Chaos FC 7
| 
| style="text-align:center;" | 1
| style="text-align:center;" | 4:22
| Derry, Northern Ireland
| 
|-
| Win
| style="text-align:center;" | 3–1
| Stephen Bailey
| TKO (punches)
| K.O.: The Fight Before Christmas
| 
| style="text-align:center;" | 1
| style="text-align:center;" | 1:22
| Dublin, Ireland
| 
|-
|Loss
| style="text-align:center;" | 2–1
|Artemij Sitenkov
| Submission (kneebar)
| Cage of Truth 3
| 
| style="text-align:center;" | 1
| style="text-align:center;" | 1:09
| Dublin, Ireland
|
|-
| Win
| style="text-align:center;" | 2–0
| Mo Taylor
| TKO (punches)
| Cage Rage Contenders - Ireland vs. Belgium
| 
| style="text-align:center;" | 1
| style="text-align:center;" | 1:06
| Dublin, Ireland
|
|-
| Win
| style="text-align:center;" | 1–0
| Gary Morris
| TKO (punches)
| Cage of Truth 2
| 
| style="text-align:center;" | 2
| style="text-align:center;" | 0:08
| Dublin, Ireland
| 
|}

Professional boxing record

See also

 List of current UFC fighters
 List of Irish UFC fighters
 List of male mixed martial artists
 Ultimate Fighting Championship rankings

References

External links

 Conor McGregor - Profile, News Archive & Current Rankings at Box.Live
 

|-

|-

1988 births
Living people
21st-century Irish people
Featherweight mixed martial artists
Irish practitioners of Brazilian jiu-jitsu
Irish male mixed martial artists
Irish male video game actors
Irish people of English descent
Lightweight mixed martial artists
People from Crumlin, Dublin
RTÉ Sports Person of the Year winners
Sportspeople convicted of crimes
Sportspeople from Dublin (city)
Ultimate Fighting Championship champions
Ultimate Fighting Championship male fighters
Welterweight mixed martial artists
Irish people convicted of assault
Mixed martial artists utilizing boxing
Mixed martial artists utilizing wrestling
Mixed martial artists utilizing Brazilian jiu-jitsu
Mixed martial artists utilizing taekwondo
Combat sports controversies
Sprawl-and-brawl fighters
Irish eurosceptics